Emily Beecham is an English actress. She is best known for her role in the Coen Brothers film Hail, Caesar!, the AMC series Into the Badlands, and the title role in the 2017 film Daphne. She starred in the 2019 film Little Joe, for which she received the Best Actress award at the Cannes Film Festival.

Early life
Beecham was born in the Wythenshawe suburb of Manchester, the daughter of an English father and American mother from Arizona. Her father is an airline pilot. She has dual British and American citizenship. In 2003, at the age of 18, she enrolled at the London Academy of Music and Dramatic Art (LAMDA) and graduated with a BA in 2006.

Career
In her final year at LAMDA, Beecham started accepting professional acting opportunities, with her first appearances occurring in the thriller Bon Voyage and the supernatural TV series Afterlife. Her first feature film, Bon Voyage, premiered that October and received positive notices following its showing on ITV. It won the Golden Nymph award at the June 2007 Monte Carlo Television Festival.

In mid-2007, Beecham was chosen by the director Jan Dunn for the leading role in her independent film The Calling, for which she won the Best Actress Award at the London Independent Film Festival, and the Edinburgh International Film Festival Trailblazer Award. The film received mixed reviews; however, one commented that "newcomer Emily Beecham plays a young woman determined to take the veil and holds her own well against such stalwarts as Brenda Blethyn and Susannah York". Film columnist Hannah McGill, the Edinburgh Festival's artistic director from 2006 to 2010, decided that Beecham should be one of the recipients of the coveted Skillset Trailblazer Award. That year, Beecham gave her first professional stage performance in Ian McHugh's first play, How to Curse, at the Bush Theatre in Shepherd's Bush, London, directed by the theatre's artistic director Josie Rourke. In 2011, she received the Best Actress award at the London Independent Film Festival.

Beecham has appeared in numerous television series, including Agatha Christie's Marple, Tess of The D'Urbervilles, Silent Witness and The Street. She was listed in Nylon magazine's "Young Hollywood" issue as one of 55 "Faces of the Future", with the photograph captioned "Young Hollywood London". John Rankin, Esquire magazine's veteran glamour photographer, was quoted as saying that she has "that something special, that thing you just feel about someone... she's one of the most exciting actresses out there".

In 2013, Beecham starred as Caro Allingham in The Village, and as The Widow in the AMC martial arts action drama series Into the Badlands. In 2016, she had a supporting role in the Coen Brothers movie Hail, Caesar!. One year later she played the title role in Daphne, which earned her a nomination for the Best Actress award at the British Independent Film Awards. In 2019, she starred in the film Little Joe, for which she received the Best Actress award at the Cannes Film Festival. She also appeared in the Netflix series 1899, created by Jantje Friese and Baran bo Odar; a period mystery/horror blend, the series was canceled after one season despite being one of the service's highest-rated shows at the time.

Filmography

Film

Television

Video games

References

External links

Living people
Actresses from Manchester
Alumni of the London Academy of Music and Dramatic Art
British emigrants to the United States
Cannes Film Festival Award for Best Actress winners
English film actresses
English people of American descent
English stage actresses
English television actresses
English video game actresses
English voice actresses
People educated at Hurtwood House
21st-century American actresses
21st-century English actresses